Lippert is a surname. It may also refer to:

 Lippert Pictures, an American company that released 130 films between 1948 and 1955
 Lippert Peak, Ellsworth Land, Antarctica
 Lippert Lake, Carver County, Minnesota

See also
 Lippert House, Mason City, Iowa, on the National Register of Historic Places